Shishkino is a rural locality (a village) in Borovetskoye Rural Settlement, Sokolsky District, Vologda Oblast, Russia. The population was 11 as of 2002.

Geography 
Shishkino is located 11 km northwest of Sokol (the district's administrative centre) by road. Gribanovo is the nearest rural locality.

References 

Rural localities in Sokolsky District, Vologda Oblast